The Forest Hills Tennis Classic is a defunct professional women's tennis tournament played on outdoor hard courts. It was part of the Tier V Series of the WTA Tour in 2004, then of the Tier IV Series from 2005 to 2008. It was held annually at the West Side Tennis Club in Forest Hills, New York City, United States, from 2004 to 2008.

Past finals

Singles

See also
 Tournament of Champions – men's tournament held at the West Side Tennis Club (1957–1959)

External links
Official website

 
Defunct tennis tournaments in the United States
Sports in Queens, New York
Hard court tennis tournaments in the United States
WTA Tour
Recurring sporting events established in 2004
Recurring sporting events disestablished in 2008
Tennis tournaments in New York City
2004 establishments in New York City
2008 disestablishments in New York (state)